Adélia da Costa Sequeira is a Portuguese applied mathematician specializing in the mathematical modeling of blood flow and the circulatory system. She is a professor of mathematics at the Instituto Superior Técnico, part of the University of Lisbon, where she is coordinator for the Scientific Area on Numerical Analysis and Applied Analysis and director of the Research Center for Computational and Stochastic Mathematics.

Education
Sequeira earned a doctorat de troisième cycle in France in 1981, at Pierre and Marie Curie University, in numerical analysis. Her dissertation, Couplage entre la méthode des éléments finis et la méthode des équations integrales: application au problème de Stokes stationnaire dans le plan, was supervised by Jean-Claude Nédélec. She has a second doctorate in mathematics, earned in 1985 at the University of Lisbon, where she also earned a habilitation in 2001.

Books
Sequeira is a coauthor of the book Hemomath: the Mathematics of Blood (Springer, 2017), and is the editor of several edited volumes.

Recognition
She is a corresponding member of the Lisbon Academy of Sciences, elected in 2018.

References

External links

Adélia Sequeira, Mulheres na ciência, Portuguese Agency of Science and Technology "Ciência Viva"

Year of birth missing (living people)
Living people
20th-century Portuguese mathematicians
Women mathematicians
Applied mathematicians
University of Lisbon alumni
Academic staff of the University of Lisbon
21st-century Portuguese mathematicians